Price Creek may refer to:

Price Creek (Iowa)
Price Creek (Ohio)
Price Creek (Pennsylvania)